Abdul Sibomana (born December 10, 1981) is a Rwandan former football defender who last played for APR FC. He was capped 24 times for his country.

Career 
After eleven years retired from professional football and is now Anchorman of the U-20 national team from Rwanda.

References

External links 
 

1981 births
Living people
Rwandan footballers
Association football defenders
Rwanda international footballers
2004 African Cup of Nations players
APR F.C. players